Budamış is a quarter of the city Kastamonu, Kastamonu District, Kastamonu Province, Turkey. Its population is 1,454 (2021).

References

Kastamonu